The Hamilton Tiger-Cats defeat the Winnipeg Blue Bombers in the Grey Cup.

Canadian Football News in 1957
In March 1957, the CRU officially adopted a resolution allowing the Ontario Rugby Football Union (ORFU) to retain its constitutional right to challenge for the Grey Cup but left it up to the Western Interprovincial Football Union and the Interprovincial Rugby Football Union to decide when the ORFU had sufficiently improved its calibre of play.

The Canadian Football Council (CFC) allowed interference to be legal up to third 5-yard stripe by eligible blockers.

The 45th annual Grey Cup game was televised live from coast to coast in Canada for the first time. TV rights brought in $125,000 for the CFC.

Regular season

Final regular season standings
Note: GP = Games Played, W = Wins, L = Losses, T = Ties, PF = Points For, PA = Points Against, Pts = Points

Bold text means that they have clinched the playoffs.
Edmonton and Hamilton both have first round byes.

Grey Cup playoffs
Note: All dates in 1957

Semifinals

WIFU 

Winnipeg won the total-point series by 28–16. The Blue Bombers will play the Edmonton Eskimos in the WIFU Finals.

IRFU 

The Alouettes will play the Hamilton Tiger-Cats in the IRFU Finals.

Finals

WIFU 

Winnipeg wins the best of three series 2–1. The Blue Bombers will advance to the Grey Cup game.

IRFU 

 Hamilton won the total-point series by 56–11. The Tiger-Cats will advance to the Grey Cup game.

Playoff Bracket

Grey Cup Championship

Canadian Football Leaders
 CFL Passing Leaders
 CFL Rushing Leaders
 CFL Receiving Leaders

1957 Eastern (Interprovincial Rugby Football Union) All-Stars
Offence
QB – Sam Etcheverry, Montreal Alouettes
RB – Cookie Gilchrist, Hamilton Tiger-Cats
RB – Gerry McDougall, Hamilton Tiger-Cats
RB – Dick Shatto, Toronto Argonauts
E  – Hal Patterson, Montreal Alouettes
E  – Menan Schriewer, Toronto Argonauts
FW – Bobby Simpson, Ottawa Rough Riders
C  – Tommy Hugo, Montreal Alouettes
OG – Dave Suminski, Hamilton Tiger-Cats
OG – Larry Hayes, Ottawa Rough Riders
OT – Kaye Vaughan, Ottawa Rough Riders
OT – John Barrow, Hamilton Tiger-CatsDefence
DT – Kaye Vaughan, Ottawa Rough Riders
DT – John Barrow, Hamilton Tiger-Cats
DE – Pete Neumann, Hamilton Tiger-Cats
DE – John Welton, Toronto Argonauts
DG – Vince Scott, Hamilton Tiger-Cats
DG – Larry Hayes, Ottawa Rough Riders
LB – Tommy Hugo, Montreal Alouettes
LB – Tony Curcillo, Hamilton Tiger-Cats
DB – Hal Patterson, Montreal Alouettes
DB – Ralph Goldston, Hamilton Tiger-Cats
DB – Bobby Kuntz, Toronto Argonauts
S  – Bobby Simpson, Ottawa Rough Riders

1957 Western (Western Interprovincial Football Union) All-Stars
Offence
QB – Ken Ploen, Winnipeg Blue Bombers
RB – By Bailey, British Columbia Lions
RB – Gerry James, Winnipeg Blue Bombers
RB – Jackie Parker, Edmonton Eskimos
RB – Johnny Bright, Edmonton Eskimos
E  – Jack Gotta, Calgary Stampeders
E  – Ernie Pitts, Winnipeg Blue Bombers
C  – Galen Wahlmeier, Saskatchewan Roughriders
OG – Harry Langford, Calgary Stampeders
OG – Ed Sharkey, British Columbia Lions
OT – Dick Huffman, Calgary Stampeders
OT – Roger Nelson, Edmonton EskimosDefence
DT – Dick Huffman, Calgary Stampeders
DT – Buddy Tinsley, Winnipeg Blue Bombers
DE – Frank Anderson, Edmonton Eskimos
DE – Herb Gray, Winnipeg Blue Bombers
MG – Art Walker, Edmonton Eskimos
LB – Ed Sharkey, British Columbia Lions
LB – Gord Rowland, Winnipeg Blue Bombers
LB – Bobby Marlow, Saskatchewan Roughriders
LB – Ted Tully, Edmonton Eskimos
DB – Jack Gotta, Calgary Stampeders
DB – Larry Isbell, Saskatchewan Roughriders
S  – Oscar Kruger, Edmonton Eskimos

1957 Canadian Football Awards
 Most Outstanding Player Award – Jackie Parker (RB), Edmonton Eskimos
 Most Outstanding Canadian Award – Gerry James (RB), Winnipeg Blue Bombers
 Most Outstanding Lineman Award – Kaye Vaughan (OT/DT), Ottawa Rough Riders
 Jeff Russel Memorial Trophy (IRFU MVP) – Dick Shatto (RB), Toronto Argonauts
 Jeff Nicklin Memorial Trophy (WIFU MVP) - Jackie Parker (QB), Edmonton Eskimos
 Gruen Trophy (IRFU Rookie of the Year) - Gary W.C. Williams (HB), Toronto Argonauts
 Dr. Beattie Martin Trophy (WIFU Rookie of the Year) - Mike Lashuk (FB), Edmonton Eskimos
 DeMarco–Becket Memorial Trophy (WIFU Outstanding Lineman) - Art Walker (DE), Edmonton Eskimos
 Imperial Oil Trophy (ORFU MVP) - ???

1957 Miss Grey Cup
Miss BC Lions Carol Lucas was named Miss Grey Cup 1957

References

 
Canadian Football League seasons